Just Us! Coffee Roasters Co-op is a Canadian importer of fair trade coffee, tea, sugar, and chocolate. Based in Grand Pré, Nova Scotia, Just Us! products are sold throughout Canada, typically in shops specializing in fair trade goods such as Ten Thousand Villages.

The company was founded in 1996 by Jeff and Debra Moore and 3 friends, after a visit by Jeff Moore to the mountainous coffee-producing regions of Mexico in December 1995. The name was conceived as a pun on the word justice, reflecting the motivations behind the fair trade movement.

The business began as a coffee roastery in New Minas. Just Us! was a trailblazer in the coffee industry as the first fair trade coffee roaster in Canada, starting a movement that lead to many other fair trade roasters in Canada. The business was started to serve as an example of alternative forms of business. The company is still a worker co-operative focusing on social and environmental justice to this day. Just Us! uses coffee as a vehicle for change. Rather than using the charity model to support farmers in the Global South, Justice partners with producers to empower them to take control over their own land, food, and their lives. They aim to show the world the benefits of social enterprise and using business for the greater good.

The roastery is now located in Grand-Pre. Fair Trade remains the main focus of the business. Just Us! has extended its product line to include chocolate, teas, and sugar and expanded operations to include a fair trade chocolate factory in Grand Pré, Nova Scotia. Just Us! has two cafes in Wolfville, Nova Scotia and Grand-Pré, Nova Scotia and wholesales to countless cafes, restaurants, and grocery stores across Atlantic Canada. They also sell their products on their online store.

Canada 150, Mi'kmaki 13000
Just Us! has also gained international attention for its statement made through its road sign and posted on social media stating, "Canada 150, Mi'kmaki 13000". The sign was made as an effort to bring attention to the struggles of Indigenous peoples living in Canada during the widespread celebrations of Canada's 150th birthday.

References

External links

Just Us! official website and online store
 

Fair trade brands
Coffee brands
Companies based in Nova Scotia
Food and drink companies of Canada
Food and drink companies established in 1995
Worker cooperatives of Canada
1995 establishments in Nova Scotia